A junta is a government led by a committee of, usually military, leaders. Bolivia has been ruled by multiple such bodies.

Government Junta of Bolivia may refer to:
Government Junta of Bolivia (1861)
Government Junta of Bolivia (1879–1880)
Government Junta of Bolivia (1899)
Government Junta of Bolivia (1920–1921)
Government Junta of Bolivia (1930–1931)
Government Junta of Bolivia (1936–1938)
Government Junta of Bolivia (1943–1944)
Government Junta of Bolivia (1946–1947)
Government Junta of Bolivia (1951–1952)
Government Junta of Bolivia (1964–1966)
Government Junta of Bolivia (1970)
Government Junta of Bolivia (1971)
Government Junta of Bolivia (1980)
Government Junta of Bolivia (1981)
Government Junta of Bolivia (1982)

See also 

 Coups d'état in Bolivia